Our Lady of Aberdeen is a type of Madonna and Child statuettes copied from the Notre Dame du Bon Succès statuette located in Brussels. Such replicas are to be found across the North East of Scotland.

History 
It is believed that the statue in Brussels may have been in Old Aberdeen as early as 1450. References to a statue in a Chapel at the Bridge of Dee in Aberdeen suggest that it may have been placed there by Bishop Gavin Dunbar of Aberdeen (1514–1531).  At the beginning of the Scottish Reformation (c. 1559) many religious objects from churches in Aberdeen and the St Machar's Cathedral in Old Aberdeen were given for safe keeping to Catholic sympathisers. It is claimed that the statue was in the hands of a Catholic family, the Gordons of Strathbogie, until 1625. It was then sent to the Low Countries by a William Laing, thought to be the Procurer for the Kings of Spain to the Infanta Isabella Clara Eugenia in Brussels. There is a reliable history of Notre Dame du Bon Succès in Brussels from that date.

Locations 
There are copies in St Mary's Cathedral, Aberdeen and in the Bishop’s House, formerly the Convent of the Sacred Heart in Aberdeen. Other copies include one in Buckie and one in St Peter's Church in Aberdeen.

Feast day 
The Catholic Church in Scotland celebrates 9 July as Our Lady of Aberdeen Day.

See also 
For historic details of Notre Dame du Bon Succès and Our Lady of Aberdeen see the papers by Ray McAleese – below. The monograph by Ron Smith (see below) gives a devotional account of beliefs about Our Lady of Aberdeen and Notre Dame du Bon Succès.

Citations

References

Blackhall, G. (1844). A Brieffe Narration of the Services done to Three Noble Ladyes by Gilbert Blakhal, priest of the Scots mission in France, in the Low Countries and in Scotland. M.DC.XXXI-M.DC.XLIX. Edited by John Stuart, Aberdeen.

Buyle, A. (2008). L'église Notre-Dame du Finistère à Bruxelles aux XVIIIe at XIXe Siècles: Redecouvertes et documents inédits, Collection Investigations 1, Inédits publiés par la Societé Royale d'Archéologie de Bruxelles, Editions Nauwelaerts.

Chisholm, D. (1898). Our Lady of Aberdeen. Roehampton, Convent of the Sacred Heart.

Couper, W. J. (1930). Our Lady of Aberdeen. Aberdeen.

Croly, C. (N.D.). Our Lady of Aberdeen. Aberdeen, City of Aberdeen.

De Los Rios, B (1664) De Hierarchia Mariana: Libris Sex, Antwerp.

Healy, T. (1976). Our Lady of Aberdeen : the hidden statue. Glasgow, Burns.

Henderson, J. A. (1890). History of the parish of Banchory-Devenick. Aberdeen.

Kennedy, W. (1818) Annals of Aberdeen, from the Reign of King William the Lion, to the End of the Year 1818 (London: [s.n.], 1818), pp. Vols 1–2.

Macpherson, S. M. (c. 1995). A Hundred Years at Queens Cross, Catholic Diocese of Aberdeen: 9 pp.

McAleese, R.  Notre Dame Du Bon Succès or Our Lady of Aberdeen – a Pre-Reformation Statue from Scotland?, Records of the Scottish Church History Society, (2013).

McAleese, R. Our Lady of Aberdeen and Notre Dame Du Bon Succès: A Pre-Reformation Statue from Scotland, Scottish Local History (2014).

Smith, R. (2013). Our Lady of Aberdeen – the Statue in Exile: the remarkable story of the survival of this unique statue. 

Steyaert, J. W. (1994) Late Gothic sculpture : the Burgundian Netherlands, Monique Tahon-Vanroose, Museum voor Schone Kunsten, Ghent, Belgium.

Unknown (1887). How Bishop Dunbar Came to Fix the Site of the Brig O' Dee. Aberdeen Journal 18 August 1887. Aberdeen.

Unknown (1900). Our Lady of Aberdeen  – some interesting facts. Aberdeen Weekly Journal, 11 July 1900. Aberdeen.

Wichmans, A. F. (1632). Brabantia Mariana Tripartita. Antwerp, Joannes Cnobbaert.

Statues in Scotland
Statues of the Madonna and Child
Tourist attractions in Aberdeen
Catholic Church in Scotland